Philip Nicholas (born March 16, 1955) is a Republican member of the Wyoming Senate for the 10th district, encompassing Albany County.

Biography
Nicholas was born in Lander in Fremont County in central Wyoming. He graduated from Oregon State University in Corvallis, Oregon, with a Bachelor of Science in Microbiology. He received a Juris Doctor from the University of Wyoming College of Law. He works as an attorney for the law firm Nicholas & Tangeman, LLC in Laramie.

He served as a member of the Wyoming House of Representatives from 1997 to 2004. Since 2005, he has served as a member of the Wyoming Senate. From 2011-2012 he was the Senate Vice President.  From 2013-2014, he served as the Senate Majority Floor Leader.  From 2015-2016, Senator Nicholas was President of the Senate. Nicholas did not run for re-election to the State Senate in 2016.
  
He is a member of the Laramie Rotary Club, Co-Chairman of the Laramie Beautification Committee, and an Ex-Officio Member of the Laramie Chamber Business Alliance (formerly the Laramie Economic Development Corporation).

He is married with four children. He is a Roman Catholic.

His younger brother, Bob Nicholas, is a member of the Wyoming House from District 8 in Cheyenne.

References

1955 births
Living people
Republican Party members of the Wyoming House of Representatives
Oregon State University alumni
People from Lander, Wyoming
Politicians from Laramie, Wyoming
University of Wyoming College of Law alumni
Wyoming lawyers
Presidents of the Wyoming Senate
Republican Party Wyoming state senators
21st-century American politicians
Catholics from Wyoming